Habrosyne sumatrana is a moth in the family Drepanidae. It is found in Indonesia (Sumatra).

References

Moths described in 1966
Thyatirinae